is a Japanese Shinto shrine in Ōita, Ōita on the island of Kyushu.

History
Sasamuta was the chief Shinto shrine (ichinomiya) of the old Bungo Province.  It serves today as one of the ichinomiya of Ōita Prefecture.  
  The enshrined kami is:

Related pages
 List of Shinto shrines in Japan
 Modern system of ranked Shinto Shrines

References

External links 

Shinto shrines in Ōita Prefecture

Beppyo shrines